Calliapagurops is a genus of mud shrimp containing two species:

Calliapagurops charcoti de Saint Laurent, 1973 – Azores, Madeira
Calliapagurops foresti Ngoc-Ho, 2002 – Philippines

References

Thalassinidea